Hinton is a suburb of the Port Stephens local government area in the Hunter Region of New South Wales, Australia. Primarily rural, the largest population centre is the township of Hinton, which is situated on the Paterson River, near to the confluence of the Hunter and Paterson rivers. In 1835 the post office requested a name for the town and the surveyor general suggested Hinton prior to this it was known as the second arm of the hunter river. The first European settlers were 12 ex convicts in 1818.

Floods
Due to the close proximity of the Hunter and Paterson rivers and the low elevation of surrounding ground the town is often isolated for a number of days during periods of exceptionally high rainfall. Most recently this happened in March 2000 and June 2007.

Hinton School of Arts 
Located on 279 Hinton is large sandstone building a brick structure. On 12 December 1868 tenders were released for the creation of the building. The builder was J Coulton and architects were Bell and Franklin. The Foundation Stone was laid in February 1869. It was finished and opened on 25 September 1869.

Hinton Baptist Church 
In 1848 it started as a Sunday School in a home then a hall. Rev Phillip Lane joined the fellowship and began the first pastor in August 1856. He had a many skills as oversaw the construction of the church from the existing building. The church formally opened on 16 July 1857 as the third Baptist church building in Australia.

Heritage listings
Hinton has a number of heritage-listed sites, including:
 Hinton-Morpeth Road: Paterson River bridge

Population
In the 2016 Census, there were 448 people in Hinton. 89.9% of people were born in Australia and 95.7% of people spoke only English at home. The most common responses for religion were Catholic 33.5% and Anglican 28.8%.

Notes

References

External links

 Hinton at Australian Explorer

Suburbs of Port Stephens Council
Towns in the Hunter Region